Vilcha is a Ukrainian urban-type settlement in Chuhuiv Raion (prior to 2020 in Vovchansk Raion) in Kharkiv Oblast. It belongs to Vovchansk urban hromada, one of the hromadas of Ukraine. Population:

History
The urban type settlement, sometimes named New Vilcha, was founded in 1993, when the 2,000 residents of the Old Vilcha (709 km far, in Kyiv Oblast), located 45 km from the Chernobyl Nuclear Power Plant, moved here in the period 1993-1996. Immediately after the accident of 1986, the "Exclusion Zone" was recognized only in the area within a radius of 30 km from the nuclear plant.Вuilt up with typical cottage-type houses. the idea of creating a village appeared back in 1989. The Soviet authorities presented Vilcha as a showcase. This is one of the mass settlements of compact residence, where people were settled so that their relatives were next to them. The officials represented the center as industrial. The people were promised to build a bath and laundry plant, a branch of the Kharkov Radio Plant, a hotel, a sports and entertainment center for young people with 400 seats, greenhouses and even a swimming pool.

Until 18 July 2020, Vilcha belonged to Vovchansk Raion. The raion was abolished in July 2020 as part of the administrative reform of Ukraine, which reduced the number of raions of Kharkiv Oblast to seven. The area of Vovchansk Raion was merged into Chuhuiv Raion.

Geography
Located 6 km south of Vovchansk, and not too far from the borders with the Russian Oblast of Belgorod; Vilcha it is served by the provincial highway T2104, and by Harbuzivka railway station, on Belgorod-Kupiansk line. The town is 20 km far from Bilyi Kolodiaz, 26 from Staryi Saltiv, 52 from Velykyi Burluk, 56 from Belgorod and 71 from Kharkiv.

See also
Vilcha, Kyiv Oblast

References

External links

Urban-type settlements in Chuhuiv Raion
Populated places established in 1993

Aftermath of the Chernobyl disaster